

Geography 
Canary Islands
 Montaña Tamia – volcano in the Province of Las Palmas at the center of Lanzarote

Music 
 Tamia – album by Canadian singer Tamia released on 1998

People 
 Tamia, born Tamia Valmont (1947) – French composer and singer
 Tamia, born Tamia Marie Washington (1975) – Canadian singer, songwriter, producer, and actress
 Tamia Liu' (1978) – Chinese actress

Literature 
 Palladis Tamia – book written in 1598 by the minister Francis Meres

Zoology 
 Tamias – genus of chipmunks within the tribe Marmotini of the squirrel family